The election for Resident Commissioner of Puerto Rico to the United States House of Representatives took place on November 6, 2012, the same day as the larger Puerto Rican general election and the United States general elections, 2012.

The Resident Commissioner of Puerto Rico is the only member of the United States House of Representatives who is elected every four years instead of a two-year term.

Incumbent Resident Representative Pedro Pierluisi of the New Progressive Party (NPP) (who caucuses with the Democratic Party), who was first elected in 2008, narrowly won reelection for a second term. Pierluisi defeated his closest opponent, Rafael Cox Alomar of the Popular Democratic Party of Puerto Rico (PPD) by almost 1.3%.

Election results

See also 
United States House of Representatives elections, 2012
Puerto Rican general election, 2012

References

External links
Puerto Rican Governor Luis Fortuno loses re-election

2012 Puerto Rico elections
Puerto Rico
2012